The New York Jazz Quartet was founded by pianist Roland Hanna.  First consisting of flautist Hubert Laws, bassist Ron Carter, and drummer Billy Cobham, in 1974 the lineup changed to Frank Wess, bassist George Mraz, and drummer Ben Riley.  Richie Pratt and Grady Tate also contributed. The group recorded for the Inner City, Enja, Salvation and Sonet Records from 1972 to 1982.

Discography
In Concert In Japan with Ron Carter, Ben Riley, Frank Wess (Salvation, 1975)
Song of the Black Knight with George Mraz, Richard Pratt, Frank Wess (Sonet, 1977)
Surge with George Mraz, Richard Pratt, Frank Wess (Enja, 1977)
Blues for Sarka with George Mraz, Grady Tate, Frank Wess (Enja, 1978)
New York Jazz Quartet in Chicago with George Mraz, Ben Riley, Frank Wess (Bee Hive, 1981)
Oasis with George Mraz, Ben Riley, Frank Wess (Enja, 1981)

References

1972 establishments in New York (state)
1982 disestablishments in New York (state)
American jazz ensembles from New York (state)
 
Enja Records artists
Inner City Records artists
Musical groups established in 1972
Musical groups disestablished in 1982